Giacomo Carafa (died 1664) was a Roman Catholic prelate who served as Archbishop of Rossano (1646–1664).

Biography
Giacomo Carafa was born in Naples, Italy and ordained a priest in June 1646.
On 18 Oct 1646, he was appointed during the papacy of Pope Innocent X as Archbishop of Rossano.
On 21 Oct 1646, he was consecrated bishop by Pier Luigi Carafa (seniore), Cardinal-Priest of Santi Silvestro e Martino ai Monti, with Alfonso Sacrati, Bishop Emeritus of Comacchio, and Ranuccio Scotti Douglas, Bishop of Borgo San Donnino, serving as co-consecrators. 
He served as Archbishop of Rossano until his death on 7 Apr 1664.

References

External links and additional sources
 (for Chronology of Bishops)
 (for Chronology of Bishops)

17th-century Roman Catholic archbishops in the Kingdom of Naples
Bishops appointed by Pope Innocent X
1664 deaths